Charles E. Gilmur Jr. (August 13, 1922 – January 14, 2011) was an American basketball player, enthusiast, and high school teacher.

A 6'4" forward/center from the University of Washington, Gilmur earned first-team All-PCC honors in 1943. He played in the National Basketball Association from 1946 to 1951 as a member of the Chicago Stags and Washington Capitols. He averaged 5.8 points per game in his career and led the league in personal fouls (231) during the 1947–48 season. Gilmur later worked as a teacher and basketball coach in Washington state.   

Gilmur died on January 14, 2011.

BAA/NBA career statistics

Regular season

Playoffs

Notes

1922 births
2011 deaths
American men's basketball players
Basketball players from Seattle
Chicago Stags players
High school basketball coaches in the United States
Washington Capitols players
Washington Huskies men's basketball players
Centers (basketball)
Forwards (basketball)